Planes Mistaken for Stars is an American rock band formed in Peoria, Illinois in 1997. Working with several different labels, they released three studio albums and four EPs before breaking up in 2008. While rooted in the post-hardcore and emo scenes of the turn of the century, Planes Mistaken for Stars developed a distinctive musical style strongly influenced by heavy metal and rock and roll. Reuniting for live performances in 2010, they went on to release their fourth album Prey in 2016.

History

Formation (1997–1999) 
In 1997, lead singer and guitarist Gared O'Donnell started the band with guitarist Matt Bellinger, bassist Aaron Wise and drummer Mike Ricketts. Shortly after the band self-released a self-titled EP in 1998, Wise was replaced by Jamie Drier. Deep Elm later reissued the EP in August 1999. They also released the 7" single "Fucking Fight" on Steve Aoki's Dim Mak Records later that same year.

Intermediate years (1999–2006) 
In 1999, Planes Mistaken for Stars moved to Denver, Colorado. After the move, the band recorded their second release for Deep Elm, Knife In The Marathon. In 2001, the band signed to Gainesville, Florida's No Idea Records to release Fuck with Fire. The next year they released an EP titled Spearheading the Sin Movement and also made an appearance on Black on Black: A Tribute to Black Flag, a tribute to the hardcore punk band Black Flag.

In 2003, Planes saw its second line up change. Jamie Drier left the band and was replaced by Chuck French, formerly of the band Peralta. Chuck played his first show with Planes on November 2, 2003.

Later that year, Planes recorded Up in Them Guts with A. J. Mogis, whose most notable work is with Saddle Creek artists Bright Eyes and The Faint. Up in Them Guts was released in 2004 on No Idea. To promote the record, the band took on one of the lengthiest tour schedules of their career, covering the United States and Europe with bands such as The Ataris, Cursive, Against Me!, Dillinger Escape Plan, Hot Water Music and High on Fire on six separate tours. They also made festival appearances at Skate and Surf Fest, Strhess Fest, and Hellfest. In 2005, Planes completed three additional headlining tours; one in the United Kingdom, and two in the United States.

In early 2006, Planes' original guitarist Matt Bellinger parted ways with the band to pursue other musical endeavors starting with Ghost Buffalo and Il Cattivo. Despite rumors of the band signing with metal label Relapse Records, they announced a deal with Abacus Recordings/Century Media Records in late-2005 and planned to release a new record mid-2006. Originally scheduled for a June 6, 2006 (6/6/6) release, the record had been pushed back in order to accommodate the schedule of the producer they chose to work with, Matt Bayles, who has worked with bands such as Mastodon and Isis. What would be their final record, Mercy, was released on October 3, 2006.

Dissolution (2007–2008) 
In July 2007, Planes Mistaken for Stars announced that they had broken up. They performed their final concert on February 16, 2008, at the Marquis Theater in Denver. Chuck French and Neil Keener are together in a group called Git Some. Keener is also in a drone band called Bull of Heaven with songwriter Clayton Counts. French is in a band called Wovenhand with former 16 Horsepower singer David Eugene Edwards. Gared O'Donnell was in a project titled Hawks and Doves. Matt Bellinger was in a project called Ghost Buffalo who had two records out on Denver's Suburban Home Records, and was later in a rock band called Il Cattivo. Mike Ricketts and Jamie Drier are playing together in a group called onYou in Chicago.

Reunion, Prey and O'Donnell's death (2010–present) 
Starting in 2010, Planes Mistaken for Stars began to sporadically play shows and go on tour, starting with Fest 9 in Gainesville, Florida. Planes Mistaken for Stars toured the US East Coast in mid-2012, and the US West Coast in mid-2014.

Following a series of cryptic online videos with testimonials from Brann Dailor (Mastodon), Ryan Patterson (Coliseum), Nate Newton (Converge, Old Man Gloom) and Jeremy Bolm (Touché Amoré), the indie label Deathwish Inc. announced it would reissue Planes Mistaken for Stars' 2006 final album Mercy on July 14, 2015, which was followed by a short promotional East Coast US tour. Along with the announcement of the reissue, the band also revealed they had been "quietly and persistently working on new music" for a near-future release also on Deathwish.

A little over a year after initially teasing it, Planes Mistaken for Stars released their fourth full-length album – and first release of new material in 10 years – titled Prey on October 21, 2016, through Deathwish.

On September 19, 2017, an article from Westword by Jason Heller confirmed that guitarist Matt Bellinger had died on September 7. Bellinger was imprisoned in Douglas County Jail for charges including vehicle trespass, theft, possession of a weapon, and obstructing the police. According to CBS4, the death was ruled as a suicide by hanging, although an investigation was opened to determine the cause of death.

On November 25, 2021, the band confirmed that O'Donnell had died. In a statement, they confirmed that the final Planes Mistaken For Stars album had been completed and would be released:

Musical style 
According to The A.V. Club, Planes Mistaken for Stars have "always excelled" in a "space between classic rock, stoner metal, and discordant hardcore". Stereogum called them one of the "heaviest" groups of the "post-hardcore underground of the '00s"; similarly, Metal Hammer called them one of few good bands of the "post-hardcore/emo boom of the early part of the millennium", stating that their "gritty, rough and discordant punk always came laced with melody and imbued with the spirit of classic rock'n'roll". Punknews.org wrote that they are "one of the few [bands] who could mix genres such as metal, hardcore, punk and post-hardcore all together, to such great effect". According to SLUG Magazine, they have existed "on the periphery of emo, punk, hardcore and rock n' roll".

Members 
Current
 Mike Ricketts – drums (1997–2008, 2010–present)
 Chuck French – guitar (2004–2008, 2010–present), bass (2003–2004)
 Neil Keener – bass (2004–2008, 2010–present)

Former
 Aaron Wise – bass (1997–1998)
 Jamie Drier – bass (1998–2003)
 Matt Bellinger – guitar, vocals (1997–2006; died 2017)
 Gared O'Donnell – vocals, guitar (1997–2008, 2010–2021; died 2021)

Timeline

Discography

Studio albums 
 Fuck with Fire (2001, No Idea)
 Up in Them Guts (2004, No Idea)
 Mercy (2006, Abacus)
 Prey (2016, Deathwish)

Compilation albums 
 We Ride to Fight! (The First Four Years) (2007)

Singles, EPs 
 Planes Mistaken for Stars (1998, self-released)
 Planes Mistaken for Stars / Appleseed Cast / Race Car Riot (1999, Deep Elm)
 Fucking Fight (1999, Dim Mak)
 Knife in the Marathon (2000, Deep Elm)
 Spearheading the Sin Movement (2002, No Idea)

Compilation appearances 
 Black on Black: A Tribute to Black Flag (2002, Initial)
 If It Plays... (2004, Thinker Thought)

References 

Musical groups established in 1997
Musical groups disestablished in 2008
Musical groups reestablished in 2010
Culture of Peoria, Illinois
Musical groups from Denver
Punk rock groups from Colorado
Hardcore punk groups from Illinois
American post-hardcore musical groups
American emo musical groups
Heavy metal musical groups from Illinois
Heavy metal musical groups from Colorado
Deathwish Inc. artists
Abacus Recordings artists